Future is the ninth studio album of the music project Schiller created by the German electronic musician Christopher von Deylen. On this album Schiller has collaborated with the singers Kêta, Arlissa, Emma Hewitt, Samu Haber, Sheppard Solomon, Maggie Szabo, Cristina Scabbia and Tawgs Salter and with Sharon Stone, who wrote the lyrics of "For You". The album reached in its first week number 1 of the German albums chart. This is Schiller's fifth number-1-album in Germany.

It was released in different editions, including the limited "Ultra Deluxe Edition". It's the first studio album of Schiller with a title in English language. The cover art work includes pictures by photographer Philip Glaser. On  the Standard Edition was released on Spotify.

The album is something of a departure from Schiller's previous body of work, with a somewhat harsher and colder sound and style, and with more focus on synth pop than ambient soundscapes. It also features a number of vocalists that Schiller had not previously worked with, whilst regular vocalists from recent years do not appear at all.

After the release of Opus in 2013, Schiller announced that there will be no release of a new studio album until 2016. For the production of the album von Deylen left Berlin and moved to California and spent some time in the Mojave Desert.

Von Deylen describes his album as a movie soundtrack, which has to be listened as whole.

Track listings

Deluxe edition 

The blue Deluxe edition includes an audio CD and a DVD.

 Willkommen
 The Future I (with Kêta)
 The Future II (with Kêta)
 The Future III
 Sweet Symphony (My Heart Beats Again) (with Sheppard Solomon)
 Paradise (with Arlissa)
 Schwerelos
 Zwischen Gestern und Morgen
 Once Upon a Time I
 Once Upon a Time II
 I Breathe (with Cristina Scabbia)
 Mirai
 Not in Love (with Arlissa)
 Save Me a Day (with Samu Haber)
 Die Nacht gehört uns
 Looking Out For You (Against the Tide) (with Emma Hewitt)
 For You (with Tawgs Salter)

Super deluxe edition 

The red Super deluxe edition includes three audio CDs and a DVD.

CD 1 - Future I

 Willkommen
 The Future I (with Kêta)
 The Future II (with Kêta)
 The Future III
 Rubinrot
 Sweet Symphony (My Heart Beats Again) (with Sheppard Solomon)
 Paradise (with Arlissa)
 Schwerelos
 Zwischen Gestern und Morgen
 Something There (with Maggie Szabo)
 Once Upon a Time I
 Once Upon a Time II
 I Breathe (with Cristina Scabbia)
 Jupitermond
 Once Upon a Time - Reprise
 Looking Out For You (Against the Tide) (with Emma Hewitt)

CD 2 - Future II

 Die Reise geht weiter
 Not in Love (with Arlissa)
 Little Earthquakes (with Sheppard Solomon)
 Little Earthquakes - Reprise
 The Wait is Over (with Kêta)
 Turqoise
 Wellenreiter
 Mirai
 Es ist voller Sterne
 Only Love (with Emma Hewitt)
 Save Me a Day (with Samu Haber)
 Die Nacht gehört uns
 Forget (with Kêta)
 For You (with Tawgs Salter)
 Future - Reprise

CD 3 - Philharmonia

Live from the Philharmonia in Berlin

 Exposition
 Desert Empire
 Oasis
 Denn wer liebt
 Ruhe
 Ultramarin
 Sonnenuhr
 Berlin - Moskau
 Atemlos
 Mitternacht
 Swan Lake
 Das Glockenspiel

DVD - Future III

Ultra deluxe edition 
The black limited Ultra deluxe edition includes the audio CDs Future I, Future II, Philharmonia and the DVD Future III and the bonus CD Tal des Himmels.

Bonus CD - Tal des Himmels

 Tal des Himmels Eins
 Tal des Himmels Zwei
 Tal des Himmels Drei
 Tal des Himmels Vier
 Tal des Himmels Fünf
 Tal des Himmels Sechs
 Tal des Himmels Sieben

Vinyl 
The limited violet vinyl edition includes two vinyls.

LP 1
 The Future I
 The Future II
 Schwerelos
 Zwischen gestern und morgen
 Paradise
 Forget
 Looking Out For You (Against the Tide)

LP 2
 Sweet Symphony (My Heart Beats Again)
 Mirai
 Es ist voller Sterne
 The Wait is Over
 Once Upon a Time I
 Once Upon a Time II
 Die Nacht gehört uns
 For You

Credits and personnel

 Christopher von Deylen – music and production of all tracks except of "For You", lyrics of all vocal tracks except of "For You", production of "For You"
 Franziska Pigulla – voice on "Willkommen"
 Kêta Jo McCue – music, lyrics and vocals on "The Future I", "The Future II", "The Wait is Over", "Forget"
 Arlissa Ruppert – music, lyrics and vocals on "Paradise", "Not in Love"
 Sheppard Solomon – music, lyrics and vocals on "Sweet Symphony (My Heart Beats Again)", "Little Earthquakes"; music and lyrics on "Save Me a Day"
 Clare Reynolds – music and lyrics on "Paradise"
 Maggie Szabo – music, lyrics and vocals on "Something There"
 Cristina Scabbia – music, lyrics and vocals on "I Breathe"
 Emma Hewitt – music, lyrics and vocals on "Looking Out For You (Against the Tide)", "Only Love"
 Anthony Hewitt – lyrics on "Looking Out For You (Against the Tide)"
 Sinai Tedros – music and lyrics on "Not in Love"
 Samu Haber – vocals on "Save Me a Day"
 Thomas Tawgs Salter – music and vocals on "For You"
 Sharon Vonne Stone – lyrics on "For You"
 Windy Wagner – background vocals on "The Future II", "Sweet Symphony (My Heart Beats Again)" "Paradise", "Once Upon a Time I", "I Breathe", "Once Upon a Time - Reprise", "Looking Out For You (Against the Tide)", "Little Earthquakes", "Only Love", "Save Me a Day", "Forget", "For You"
 Amy Keys – background vocals on "Sweet Symphony (My Heart Beats Again)"
 Samantha Nelson – background vocals on "Paradise", "Something There", "Once Upon a Time I", "Looking Out For You (Against the Tide)", "Not in Love", "Save Me a Day"
 Carmel Echols – background vocals on "Paradise", "Something There", "Once Upon a Time I", "Looking Out For You (Against the Tide)", "Not in Love",  "Save Me a Day"
 Chaz Mason – background vocals on "Paradise", "Something There", "Once Upon a Time I", "Looking Out For You (Against the Tide)", "Not in Love", "Save Me a Day"
 Onitsa Shaw – background vocals on "Looking Out For You (Against the Tide)", "Little Earthquakes"

Instruments 
 John Groover McDuffie – pedal steel guitar on "Paradise", "Schwerelos"

Cover art 

 Schiller – concept of the neon light sign
 Philip Glaser – photography
 Kyle Monk – guest photographer
 Katja Stier – design

Charts

Weekly charts

Weekly charts

External links 
 DW about the new album Future

References

Schiller (band) albums
2016 albums